Portrait of a Young Man is a c.1500 oil on panel portrait of an unknown subject by Giovanni Bellini. It measures 31×25 cm and is now in the National Gallery of Art in Washington.

References

1500 paintings
Young Man, Washington
Young Man, Washington
Collections of the National Gallery of Art